This is a list of the Turkey national football team results from 2010 to 2019.

2010

2011

2012

2013

2014

2015

2016

2017

2018

2019

Other unofficial games

Notes

Turkey national football team results